Canwest Global Communications Corporation, which operated under the corporate name Canwest, was a major Canadian media conglomerate based in Winnipeg, Manitoba, with its head offices at Canwest Place.  It held radio, television broadcasting and publishing assets in several countries, primarily in Canada.

Canwest was founded in 1974 by Izzy Asper through the formation of CIII-TV in Toronto under the Global Television Network. The company expanded through the 1980s and 1990s with the initial public offering in 1991 as a publicly-traded corporation and the international expansion of its operations in Ireland, Australia, New Zealand, United Kingdom and Turkey. Throughout the years, under Leonard Asper, who became its President and CEO in 1999, Canwest grew into a major media powerhouse by acquiring media properties such as Western International Communications and the Southam newspaper publishing. In 2007, with Goldman Sachs, Canwest acquired the broadcasting arm of Alliance Atlantis.

After years of debt, Canwest began to slowly collapse in 2008 amid the Great Recession and later entered bankruptcy protection in late 2009, that lead to the sales of its publishing and broadcasting arms the following year to Postmedia Network, founded by National Post CEO Paul Godfrey and Shaw Communications, which later reorganized its media division as Shaw Media. On April 1, 2016, the broadcasting assets were subsumed into Corus Entertainment, an existing broadcasting firm also owned by the Shaw family.

Following the sale of assets, the company was renamed 2737469 Canada Inc., ceased to carry on business, and commenced bankruptcy proceedings under the Bankruptcy and Insolvency Act before finally being dissolved on May 27, 2013.

Operations

As of April 2009 (prior to seeking creditor protection), Canwest owned, in whole or part, a variety of Canadian media assets, including:
 Global, a primary Canadian television network which reaches over 94% of the English-speaking population of Canada;
 E!, a now-defunct secondary Canadian television system consisted of five smaller-market stations; however, through repeaters and cable television, it reaches the majority of major Canadian markets. The "E!" name was licensed by the American channel of the same name, which also supplies the majority of its programming outside of local news and regional programming and primetime shows from the American broadcast networks;
 Specialty services including Showcase, Slice, HGTV, TVTropolis, Food Network, History Television, and various digital services;
 Southam Inc. and its former properties, which included the number-two national newspaper National Post, the broadsheet daily newspapers in most major markets, several other smaller newspapers, and the Canwest News Service newswire. Canwest was Canada's largest newspaper publisher;
 Production, distribution, and Internet assets associated with all the Canwest properties

The company had previously sold off some of the smaller newspapers it had acquired in the Southam purchase. Canwest also previously owned broadcasting operations in Australia (as majority shareholder of Network Ten), New Zealand (through CanWest MediaWorks New Zealand), the Republic of Ireland (as a minority shareholder of TV3) and Turkey (as the owners of four radio stations).

History

Beginnings
In 1974, a group led by Israel Asper bought the assets of Pembina, North Dakota television station KCND-TV from broadcaster Gordon McLendon, moving the station to Winnipeg as independent station CKND-TV. Asper, through his company, Canwest, eventually bought out his partners in the Winnipeg station.  A few months later, the Asper group joined a consortium that bought CKGN-TV, a network of six simulcasting transmitters across Ontario that carried many of CKND's programs and was known on-air as the Global Television Network.  Canwest bought controlling interest in Global, now using the callsign CIII-TV, in 1985, thus becoming the first western-based owner of a major Canadian broadcaster. He acquired the remaining stock in 1989.

Canwest subsequently invested in or acquired other independent TV stations across Canada.  Eventually, his station group became known as the "Canwest Global System."  In 1997, Canwest bought controlling interest in CKMI-TV, the privately owned CBC affiliate in Quebec City.  Canwest then set up CKMI rebroadcasters in Montreal and Sherbrooke.  With this move, Canwest's stations now had enough coverage of Canada that on August 18—the day CKMI officially disaffiliated from CBC—Canwest scrubbed all local brands from its stations, rebranding them as "The Global Television Network," Canada's third television network. Throughout the 1990s, Global (and its antecedents) held Canadian rights to hit U.S. series such as Cheers, Friends, and Frasier.

Canwest also bought broadcasting assets internationally, including outlets in New Zealand, the Republic of Ireland, and Australia, although all were eventually sold off.  In 1991, Canwest issued a successful initial public offering on the Toronto Stock Exchange.  In June 1996, Canwest was listed on the New York Stock Exchange.

Beyond broadcasting and the newspapers
Lacking a presence in Alberta, the company set its sights on Western International Communications, which owned three independent stations in that province that carried Global programming.  It eventually bought that company's broadcasting assets in 2000.  This not only boosted Global's coverage in western Canada, but prompted the establishment of a second over-the-air service, originally known as CH, since in some areas the combined company had duplicate over-the-air coverage through multiple stations. Later that year, Canwest announced its acquisition of the Southam newspaper chain from Conrad Black, in order to pursue a media convergence strategy. 

Canwest was initially slow to invest in specialty channels due to the strength of its terrestrial network. In 1999, seeking to change this, the company announced a deal to buy out the Canadian partners of NetStar Communications, owner of TSN, but was stymied by U.S. partner ESPN, which had veto power over such a sale.  ESPN instead came to terms with Canwest's main rival CTV, a longtime business partner of ESPN's parent company Disney, as an acceptable buyer, which the selling partners eventually agreed to.

In 2005 CanWest released a new website canada.com which was a digital media platform for its digitally transformed brands. These included many local news outlets and larger "papers" as well as other media brands. The brands were represented under "canada.com Network" and included (taken from website footer): Newspapers: National Post, Calgary Herald, Edmonton Journal, The Montreal Gazette, Ottawa Citizen, Regina Leader Post, The Saskatoon Star Phoenix, The Vancouver Sun, The Vancouver Province, Victoria Times Colonist, The Windsor Star, Dose, Vancouver Island Newspaper, VANNEET Newspaper; Television: Global, CH, Prime TV, Fox Sports World Canada, Lonestar, Mystery, Xtreme Sports, Deje View, mentv, Cool TV; Radio: CoolFM 99.1, 91.5 The Beat; Marketplace: working.com, driving.ca, connecting, celebrating, remembering, homes. The website experience was centred around news, city guides, activities and events to leverage advertising revenue. The site was designed by Cossette / Fjord out of Toronto, Canada in 2005.

In October 2005, CanWest's Canadian newspapers were sold into an IPO trust.  Sold 25.8% of Canada's newspapers for C$550 million.  Attached to the Canadian newspaper IPO was $850 million in long term debt.  CanWest bought back the 25.8% Newspaper Trust IPO (and debt) in November 2008, for cash considerations of $495 million. In April 2006, Canwest acquired four radio stations in Turkey: Super FM, Metro FM, Joy FM and Joy Turk FM from The Turkish Savings and Deposit Insurance Fund for aggregate cash consideration of US$61 million.

The company was already one of the largest owners of Canadian local TV stations, when Canwest and Goldman Sachs in 2007 announced they would jointly acquire Canadian producer and competing broadcaster Alliance Atlantis and its massive stable of wide-distribution specialty channels. Under the deal, Canwest took control of the broadcasting portion of AAC, although Goldman Sachs remained a major investor in those assets. Goldman retained or resold the remaining pieces of AAC, the distribution arm soon re-emerging as Alliance Films.

Canwest executives testified in the Canadian Radio-television and Telecommunications Commission hearings over fee-for-carriage, requesting that the commission force cable and satellite companies to pay for their signals without passing the fees on to their subscribers. In his testimony, Canwest president Leonard Asper blamed the current rules for the poor financial condition of Canada's broadcast television stations, a position which has subsequently been adopted and addressed through rule changes by the CRTC and FCC.

Restructuring and creditor protection
Canwest's various acquisitions took a significant financial toll. As early as 2002, most of Canwest's operating income was going to pay interest on its high-interest rate debt. By 2007, the company's bonds were downgraded to junk status. By early 2009, it became clear the company's debt was not manageable in light of the global economic crisis, forcing Canwest into an extended set of negotiations with its lenders and a series of cost-cutting moves. The company's income statements reported net losses in 2008 and 2009, even though its operating activities were profitable (before taxes, interest, and non-operating charges: C$197 million in 2009, vs. C$428 million in 2008).

In May 2009, Canwest sold off four radio stations in Turkey to Spectrum Medya.

On August 31, 2009, Canwest shut down its secondary system E! (the former CH). Three of the former E! owned-and-operated stations – CHCH Hamilton, CHEK Victoria, and CJNT Montreal – were sold to third parties, while a fourth, CHBC Kelowna, was converted to a Global station. The remaining station, CHCA Red Deer, was closed as of the same date.

On September 24, the company announced that it would sell its 50.1% stake in Ten Network Holdings for A$680 million, in order to pay down its significant debt. The sale of CanWest's Australian media operations reduced some C$582-million in debt tied to the Australian TV network, raising the total value Canwest can erase from its overall debt to more than C$1.2-billion. Before the Ten deal, Canwest held about C$3.8-billion of debt on its balance sheet. In court documents, Goldman Sachs alleges "fraudulent" and "abusive" changes to the internal operation of Canwest in the days before it filed for creditor protection. As part of the filing, the Wall Street investment bank is seeking to undo these changes, and has also claimed that CanWest's creditors should return the C$426 million they received from Canwest balance sheet in September, after CanWest sold its stake in Ten.

On October 6, the company voluntarily filed for creditor protection under the CCAA, due to C$4 billion mounting debt across radio, television broadcasting and publishing assets in several countries. At the same time it announced it had agreed to a recapitalization transaction with some of its lenders, which will likely require the approval of the Canadian Radio-television and Telecommunications Commission (CRTC).  When completed, bondholders – led by hedge funds West Face Capital, GoldenTree Asset Management, and Beach Point Capital Management – will own a majority of shares, leaving existing shareholders, including the Asper family, with a total of 2.3% of the "new" Canwest. However, the Aspers are expected to invest a further C$15 million in the restructured entity.

In January 2010, CanWest's bonds commanded about 70 cents on the dollar. CanWest's bonds at one point traded for as little as 15 cents on the dollar.  Several sources say that as CanWest notes increased fivefold in price, distressed-debt funds took profits on part of their position, with Angelo Gordon among the buyers.

On February 3, 2010, it was reported that a group led by Golden Tree Asset Management LP complained that "it was unfairly frozen out of the auction of Canwest Limited Partnership."

As part of the transaction, Canwest and some of its subsidiaries, including Canwest Media Inc., The National Post Company, and Canwest Television LP (the licensee of Global, MovieTime, DejaView, and Fox Sports World Canada) filed for creditor protection under the Companies' Creditors Arrangements Act. Canwest Limited Partnership, a subsidiary which owns the company's other newspaper assets and online properties, is negotiating separately with creditors, and is expected to file for creditor protection at a later date. Specialty channels operated in partnership with other companies (such as TVtropolis, Mystery TV, MenTV, and the former Alliance Atlantis properties) are also not included in the present filing. Canwest shares were also suspended from trading on the TSX.

Canwest said that it was not being liquidated at this point, and the company insisted that the proceedings would make Canwest "a stronger industry competitor with a renewed financial outlook." Nevertheless, some analysts expected that the conglomerate would sell assets or be broken up entirely as the restructuring process continues, noting that the publishing division has a separate set of lenders. As it turned out, the company would indeed be broken up.

Sale of assets to Shaw and Postmedia
In February 2010, the company announced an agreement with Shaw Communications whereby the latter company would buy an 80% voting interest, and 20% equity interest, in the restructured entity, pending approvals from the Canadian Radio-television and Telecommunications Commission (CRTC) and others. The company's newspapers were not part of the Shaw deal and were already sold separately to Postmedia Network. However, the Asper family with Goldman and Catalyst made their own bid to retake Canwest with a $120 million bid in competition with the bid proposed by Shaw Communications. On February 25, 2010, it was announced that Shaw Communications had won a court battle to continue their plans to purchase assets & voting shares from Canwest. After the announcement, Shaw revealed that its investment amounted to a minimum of $95-million in exchange for 20 per cent of the equity and an 80-per-cent voting interest in the restructured company.

Although Goldman, Catalyst, and the Aspers continued to work on their own bid after the Shaw agreement, Shaw announced a revised agreement, following court ordered mediation, under which it would purchase the entirety of Canwest's broadcasting operations, including the portion owned by Goldman. This deal was later modified following a second court ordered mediation to include a settlement agreement between Shaw, creditors, and the Official Ad Hoc Committee of Shareholders, led by the Aspers, Blott Asset Management, L.L.C. and two other hedge funds. This marked the first successful equity committee campaign in Canada under CCAA. A modified deal, including the Settlement Agreement, received the approval of the Ontario Superior Court on June 23, 2010, the Competition Bureau as of August 13, 2010, and was given final approval from the CRTC on October 22, 2010, with Canwest delisting itself from the TSX and officially ceasing operations that same month. Final closing would officially occur in October 2011 following the official CMI Transition Order. Meanwhile, Shaw Communications reorganized Canwest into Shaw Media.

After bankruptcy proceedings concluded under the Bankruptcy and Insolvency Act, Canwest, by this point known as 2737469 Canada, Inc., finally dissolved on May 27, 2013. Asper, through his Syngus Corp. holding company, went on to establish Anthem Media Group in 2010 and has since grew into the portfolio through the ownership of Impact Wrestling, AXS TV, Fight Network and GameTV.

In April 2016, the Shaw Media assets were subsumed by Shaw's sister company Corus Entertainment.

Corporate governance

Board of directors
The last members of the board of directors of the company were Derek Burney, David Drybrough, David Kerr, Leonard Asper, Izzy Asper, Lisa Pankratz, Frank McKenna, David Asper, and Gail Asper. Gail Asper, David Asper, and Lisa Panktratz resigned from the board, and from all other director and officer positions within Canwest and its subsidiaries, on February 10, 2010.

Concentration of power
Canwest was often cited as an example of how the ownership of Canadian media has become concentrated in the hands of a few individuals and large corporations. Canwest founder Izzy Asper was known as a strong supporter of both Canada's Liberal Party and Israel's right-wing Likud party, and of many laissez-faire policies in both countries. Observers have suggested that Asper's political views have had a significant impact on news coverage at CanWest media outlets. For example, in 2002, Ottawa Citizen publisher Russell Mills was fired by Canwest after the paper published a series of articles exposing a financial scandal involving then Prime Minister Jean Chrétien.

Canwest's power in the marketplace was reflected in a contract that freelance contributors were required to sign. Until recently, standard industry practice was that freelancers sold the rights for one time use and only in Canada.

Editorial controversies
Since the 2000 acquisition of the major former Canadian newspaper holdings of Conrad Black's Hollinger International (now Sun-Times Media Group), including Canwest News Service, opposition has been expressed by some journalists, union spokespersons, politicians, and pundits about Canwest's enforcement of its corporate editorial positions. A 2001 decision to run regular uniform national editorials in all metropolitan dailies (except National Post), whereby local editorial boards could not take local positions on subjects of national editorials, ignited major national controversy and was subsequently withdrawn.

Conflict over Canwest editorial control and policy has focused in particular on three issues:

 The Liberal Party of Canada. Since Israel Asper's leadership of the Manitoba Liberal Party, the Asper family has been identified with Liberal politics and politicians. In July 2001, Southam national affairs columnist Lawrence Martin was fired after a column of his critical of Liberal Prime Minister Jean Chrétien was not published. Russell Mills, longtime publisher of The Ottawa Citizen, was fired in June 2002 after the newspaper called on Chrétien to resign. However, as of 2006, at least one Asper family member (David Asper) was publicly supporting the Conservatives.
 The government of Israel and conflict in the Middle East. Veteran Montreal Gazette reporter Bill Marsden has said that the Aspers "do not want any criticism of Israel. We do not run in our newspaper op-ed pieces that express criticism of Israel and what it is doing." A study released in 2006 by the Near East Cultural and Educational Foundation of Canada found that the National Post was 83.3 times more likely to report an Israeli child's death than a Palestinian child's death in its news articles' headlines or first paragraphs. In 2008 Canwest launched a lawsuit against the Palestine Media Collective for producing a newspaper parody of The Vancouver Sun that satirized this bias. In 2004, the Reuters news agency protested after Canwest altered newswire stories about the Iraq war and the Israeli–Palestinian conflict, such that Reuters felt it had inserted Canwest's own bias under Reuters bylines. The changes were apparently made in accordance with a Canwest policy to label certain groups as terrorists. Ottawa Citizen, a newspaper in the Canwest chain, made similar changes to a story by Associated Press.
 Canwest editorial control and management itself. In December 2001, staff members at The Montreal Gazette launched a Gazette Newsroom web page with an open letter, titled Media Giant Silences Local Voices: Canadian Journalism Under Attack, that got signed by 77 Gazette journalists as of 2002 January 23, opposing the national editorial policy, and the reporters among them participated in a byline strike, refusing to sign their names to their stories in the newspaper in protest. Management responded with a gag order. The next year, several journalists left The Halifax Daily News over similar conflicts, and ten journalists at The Regina Leader-Post were reprimanded or suspended after a byline strike to protest censorship of coverage of a speech in Regina by Toronto Star columnist and Canwest critic Haroon Siddiqui.

Upon acquiring Southam's Newspapers from Hollinger International, Israel Asper continued Conrad Black's policy of 'blacklisting' influential Canadian world and military affairs journalist Gwynne Dyer's internationally published articles. This antipathy was prompted by Dyer's views on conflict in the Middle East and his opposition to neoconservatism, which run contrary to the ideological views of Asper and others on Canwest's board of directors then and today. Partially as a response to this, Dyer published a collection of his articles on the Middle East and related topics called With Every Mistake in 2005.

Canwest newspapers and broadcast outlets in British Columbia were regularly criticized for giving a "free ride" to the BC Liberal government of Premier Gordon Campbell, especially in relation to the scandals and controversies ensuing from the privatization of BC Rail but also in cooperating with the government's alleged manipulation of information for political purposes, such as the suppression of the actual scale of the deficit or welfare rates in advance of the 2009 election.  Conversely, coverage of the New Democratic Party was criticized as being unfairly negative. Canwest was one of the major campaign contributors to the BC Liberal party and gave regular column space to pundits from the Fraser Institute think tank (one such regular contributor being the Premier's brother, Michael).

See also
 Postmedia News

References

Further reading
 Edge, Marc.  Asper Nation: Canada's Most Dangerous Media Company (Vancouver: New Star Books 2007)
 Edge, Marc. "Thwarting Foreign Ownership Limits: Policy Activism by CanWest Global Communications in Canada and Australia." Canadian Journal of Media Studies 5 (2009) pp: 70–87.

External links
 Shaw Media
 Who Owns What: CanWest Global Communications (Columbia Journalism Review)
 Focus on CanWest (TNG Canada/CWA)
 Information on Canwest Creditor Proceedings

Mass media companies established in 1974
Mass media companies disestablished in 2010
1974 establishments in Manitoba
2010 disestablishments in Manitoba
Defunct broadcasting companies of Canada
Defunct publishing companies of Canada
Multinational companies
Companies that have filed for bankruptcy in Canada
Former Corus Entertainment subsidiaries
Postmedia Network publications
Defunct companies of Manitoba
Defunct companies based in Winnipeg